|}

The Denford Stakes is a Listed flat horse race in Great Britain open to two-year-old horses. It is run at Newbury over a distance of 7 furlongs (1,408 metres), and it is scheduled to take place each year in August.

History
The event was originally named after Washington Singer (1866–1934), a prominent racehorse owner and philanthropist. It has been won by several subsequent Classic winners, including Rodrigo de Triano, Lammtarra and Haafhd.

The race is currently restricted to horses which have not won at Group level, and whose sires achieved victory at distances in excess of 1 mile and 1½ furlongs, or 1,900 metres.

Sponsors of the Washington Singer Stakes have included Usk Valley Stud, Matalan and Denford Stud, and in recent years it has been run under various sponsored titles. The race title formally changed to the Denford Stakes from the 2017 running.

Records
<div style="font-size:90%">
Leading jockey since 1986 (4 wins):
 Frankie Dettori – Sharp Nephew (2007), Cry of Freedom (2008), Janood (2010), Escobar (2016)

Leading trainer since 1986 (4 wins):
 Barry Hills – State Fair (1996), Bahr (1997), Valentine Girl (1998), Haafhd (2003)
 Mark Johnston – Dubai’s Touch (2006), Cry Of Freedom (2008), Somewhat (2013), Thunderous (2019)
</div>

Winners since 1986

See also
 Horse racing in Great Britain
 List of British flat horse races

References
 Paris-Turf: 
 Racing Post:

 pedigreequery.com – Washington Singer Stakes – Newbury.''

Flat races in Great Britain
Newbury Racecourse
Flat horse races for two-year-olds